Mare de Déu del Mont, also known as Serra del Mont, is a mountain range of the Alta Garrotxa natural region, Catalonia, Spain.

Description
This mountain has a traditional Virgin Mary shrine on top of El Mont, the highest peak that gives its name to the range. This summit is one of the Emblematic Summits of Catalonia.

The Mare de Déu del Mont shrine is very popular, its name meaning Mother of God of the Mountain.
It has been often mentioned in Catalan literature, having been referred to as Porta del Pirineu, meaning "the Gate of the Pyrenees", among other epithets. Catalan poet Jacint Verdaguer stayed in the sanctuary on top of the summit in 1884 and wrote some verses about the mountain. Recently a statue honoring the poet has been unveiled on top of the mountain.

Features

References

Source
 Estanislau Vayreda, "Catàleg de la flòrula de la Mare de Déu del Mont", Treballs de la Institució Catalana d'Història Natural, 1919–1920, pp. 360–442.

External links 

Mare de Deu del Mont - Paragliding
De Besalú a la cima del Mont - Costa Brava Tourism

Mountains of Catalonia
Emblematic summits of Catalonia